California Soul is an album by the Gerald Wilson Orchestra recorded in 1968 and released on the Pacific Jazz label.

Reception

AllMusic rated the album with 2 stars; in his review, Scott Yanow noted: "Gerald Wilson's next to last Pacific Jazz release is one of his weakest due in large part to the commercial material".

Track listing 
All compositions by Gerald Wilson except as indicated
 "California Soul" (Nickolas Ashford, Valerie Simpson) - 4:06
 "Light My Fire" (The Doors) - 5:00
 "Channel Island" - 5:05
 "Lullaby from Rosemary's Baby" (Krzysztof Komeda) - 2:47
 "Sunshine of Your Love" (Eric Clapton, Jack Bruce, Pete Brown) - 2:49
 "Russian River" - 5:20
 "Yesterlove" (Al Cleveland, Smokey Robinson) - 3:57
 "Down Here on the Ground" (Gale Garnett, Lalo Schifrin) - 4:45
 "El Presidente" - 4:10
Recorded at Liberty Studios in Hollywood, CA on August 7, 1968 (tracks 3 & 9), August 16, 1968 (tracks 1, 4 & 7) and September 2, 1968 (tracks 2, 5, 6 & 8).

Personnel 
Gerald Wilson - arranger, conductor
Bobby Bryant (tracks 2, 5, 6 & 8), Larry McGuire (tracks 2, 3, 5, 6, 8 & 9), Ollie Mitchell (tracks 1, 4 & 7), Alex Rodriguez (tracks 2, 3, 5, 6, 8 & 9), Tony Rusch (tracks 2, 3, 5, 6, 8 & 9), Dalton Smith (tracks 1, 4 & 7) - trumpet
Thurman Green, Lester Robertson, Frank Strong - trombone
Mike Wimberly - bass trombone
Art Maebe - French horn, tuba (tracks 3 & 9)
David Duke (tracks 2, 5, 6 & 8), George Hyde (tracks 1, 4 & 7), Jim McGee (tracks 1, 4 & 7) - French horn
Ramon Bojorquez, Henry DeVega - alto saxophone
Anthony Ortega  - alto saxophone, flute, piccolo
Hadley Caliman, Harold Land - tenor saxophone
Bill Perkins - tenor saxophone, flute (tracks 1, 4 & 7)
Richard Aplanalp - baritone saxophone
Alan Beutler - alto saxophone, baritone saxophone (tracks 2, 3, 5, 6, 8 & 9)
William Green - flute, piccolo (tracks 2, 3, 5, 6, 8 & 9)
Pete Terry - bass clarinet, bassoon
Bobby Hutcherson - vibraphone
Tommy Flanagan  (tracks 3 & 9), Jimmy Rowles, Mike Wofford (tracks 1, 4 & 7) - piano, organ, electric harpsichord
Mike Anthony - guitar 
Stanley Gilbert - bass (tracks 2, 3, 5, 6, 8 & 9)
Wilton Felder - electric bass
Carl Lott - drums
Hugh Anderson, Joe Porcaro - percussion

References 

Gerald Wilson albums
1968 albums
Pacific Jazz Records albums
Albums arranged by Gerald Wilson
Albums conducted by Gerald Wilson